Maciejewski (feminine Maciejewska, plural Maciejewscy) is a Polish surname derived from various locations with names derived from the given name Maciej: Maciejów, Maciejewice, Maciejowice,  Maciejowa etc. 

It may refer to:
 Adam Maciejewski (born 1967), Polish economist
 A. F. Maciejewski (1893-1949), American politician
 Justin Maciejewski, director of the National Army Museum
 Krzysztof Maciejewski (born 1953), Polish politician
 Monika Maciejewska (born 1970), Polish fencer
 Roman Maciejewski (1910-1998), Polish composer
 Sylwester Maciejewski (born 1955), Polish actor
 Zuzanna Maciejewska (born 1995), Polish tennis player
 Tim Maciejewski (Born 2001), German footballer

See also

Maciejowski

References

Polish-language surnames
Polish toponymic surnames